Among the Classic Mayas, the howler monkey god was a major deity of the arts—including music—and a patron of the artisans, especially of the scribes and sculptors. As such, his sphere of influence overlapped with that of the Tonsured Maize God. The monkey patrons—there are often two of them—have been depicted on classical vases in the act of writing books (while stereotypically holding an ink nap) and carving human heads. Together, these two activities may have constituted a metaphor for the creation of mankind, with the book containing the birth signs and the head the life principle or 'soul', an interpretation reinforced by the craftsman titles of the creator gods in the Popol Vuh.

Based on its facial features, the stone sculpture of a seated writer found within the House of the Scribes in Copan is often described as a howler monkey. However, it is the two large statues of simian figures shaking rattles (see fig.), found on both sides of the 'Reviewing Stand' of Copan's temple 11, that approach much more closely the standard representation of this animal in Maya art and in Long Count inscriptions (including the snakes in the corners of the mouth). Variously described as wind gods and as 'were-monkeys' and ritual clowns, these statues may actually represent howler monkeys in their quality of musicians. A ceramic incense burner modeled like a howler monkey scribe has been found at post-classic Mayapan.

At the time of the Spanish invasion, the howler monkeys continued to be venerated, although the role they played in mythological narratives diverged. Bartolomé de las Casas stated that in the Alta Verapaz, Hun-Ahan (probably 'One-Woodcarver') and Hun-Cheven (Hun-Chowen in the Popol Vuh) were counted among the thirteen sons of the upper god, and were celebrated as cosmogonic creator deities. Among the Quiché Mayas, they were less positively valued: according to the Popol Vuh, Hun-Chowen and Hun-Batz 'One-Howler Monkey' (both artists and musicians) clashed with their half-brothers, the Maya Hero Twins, a conflict which led to their humiliating transformation into monkeys.

In the mantic calendar, howler monkey (Batz), corresponding to spider monkey (Ozomatli) in the Aztec system, denotes the 11th day, which is associated with the arts. In the Long Count (see Maya calendar), the Howler Monkey can personify the day-unit, which connects him to the priestly arts of calendrical reckoning and divination, as well as to ritualistic and historical knowledge.

In popular culture 
Hun Batz is featured in the videogame Smite as a playable Maya god.

Notes

Sources

External links

Animal gods
Characters from the Popol Vuh
Maya deities
Maya calendars
Mythological monkeys
Music and singing gods
Arts gods